USS Satterlee may refer to the following ships of the United States Navy:

She was transferred to the Royal Navy as HMS Belmont in 1940 and sunk in battle in 1942 during World War II.

United States Navy ship names